Songhak station is a railway station in Songhang-ri, Kyŏnghŭng county, North Hamgyŏng province, North Korea, on the Hambuk Line of the Korean State Railway; it is also the starting point of the Ch'undu Line.

The station was opened on 16 November 1929 by the Chosen Government Railway (Sentetsu) as part of the East Tomun Line from Unggi (now Sŏnbong) to Sinasan, which was later extended to Tonggwanjin.

References

Railway stations in North Korea
Railway stations opened in 1929